Ringing tone (audible ringing, also ringback tone) is a signaling tone in telecommunication that is heard by the originator of a telephone call while the destination terminal is alerting the receiving party. The tone is typically a repeated cadence similar to a traditional power ringing signal (ringtone), but is usually not played synchronously. Various telecommunication groups, such as the Bell System and the General Post Office (GPO) developed standards, in part taken over by the European Telecommunications Standards Institute (ETSI) and other standards bodies. With modern cell phone and smartphone technology ringing tone can be customized and even used for advertising.

Purpose and description
When a telephone user initiates a telephone call, typically by dialing or selecting a telephone number on a telephone, the progress or status of the call attempt is indicated to the user audibly by a several types of call progress tones. For example, during the period of routing the call across the public switched telephone network (PSTN) the call may encounter congestion on a particular link. If this cannot be automatically resolved, the calling user receives the congestion tone, also called reorder tone. If the called station is already busy and cannot accept a second call via call waiting, the calling party is alerted with a busy signal. When the call routing is successful and the receiving telephone is not already in a call, the destination telephone receives an electrical signal, called power ringing, or the ring tone, to alert the recipient of the incoming call. During this period of alerting, the caller also receives a distinctive signal, audible ringing, also called ringing tone.

Audible ringing is typically a repeated burst of tone that is typically not synchronous with the cadence of the power ringing signal at the destination. It is usually generated in the switching system closest to the calling party, especially when under the control of strict implementations of Signalling System No. 7 and the Customized Application of Mobile Enhanced Logic (CAMEL) signaling system.  It may also be generated in the distant switch, transmitted in-band, so that in analog networks the caller could monitor the quality of the voice path of the connection before the call is established. Remote call progress indication permits customized tones or voice announcements by a distant switch in place of the ringing tone.

Ringing tone is often also called ringback tone. However, in formal telecommunication specifications that originate in the Bell System in North America, ringback has a different definition. It is a signal used to recall either an operator or a customer at the originating end of an established telephone call. It is also needed for coin-telephone lines to ring the telephone when the customer has hung up prematurely, for example to collect required overtime charges.

National characteristics

ETSI
Europe and some other countries follow European Telecommunications Standards Institute (ETSI) guidelines. These are also used worldwide, including in Latin America and in many Asian and African countries

Many European, Asian, and Latin American countries use tones that follow or take inspiration from the ETSI recommendations. Almost all of these tones have a frequency of 425 Hz;  

France uses a slight variation with a higher pitch 440 Hz tone and a cadence of one second of tone followed by three to five seconds of silence.

China uses a version of this tone, but often with at 450 Hz. 

The ETSI tone is also part of GSM mobile standards and can be generated by handsets to indicate ringing, and is frequently used on VoIP and PBX equipment, particularly of European origin.

Variations of this tone have been used since the introduction of automatic switching in Europe in the early 20th century. Older electromechanical equipment used various frequencies and slightly different cadences,

Bell System tones
In North America (excluding Mexico, Central America and parts of the Caribbean), and in South Korea, the standard audible ringing tone is a repeated cadence of a two-second tone and four seconds of silence.

This ringing tone is also commonly used on VoIP and PBX systems.

General Post Office tones
The United Kingdom, Ireland, Australia, New Zealand, Hong Kong, and other countries with historical links to British General Post Office (GPO) standards, use a double ring. In many cases, the cadence consists of a double ring of 0.4 seconds separated by 0.2 seconds, and a two second pause after which the cadence repeats (0.4s on, 0.2 s off, 0.4 s on, 2 s off). In many cases the tone is a combination of 400 Hz and 450 Hz sine waves. This more precise tone was adopted in Britain and Ireland when digital switching was introduced in 1980-1981. It was also adopted in New Zealand.

Australia uses up to three different combinations of frequencies. The example shown is created by mixing 400, 425, and 450 Hz sine waves.

Hong Kong uses the North American 440 Hz and 480 Hz tone, with a slightly different cadence, using a 3-second pause between the double rings.

A single 425Hz tone is used in Malaysia.

Variations are also found in private office PABX and VoIP systems.

Historically, pre-digital systems used the same ringing cadence, but used several different tones depending on the type of equipment in use.

There is no single standard for this double-beat tone, rather countries that were influenced by British GPO standards in the early 20th century adopted similar ringing signals in their automatic switching equipment.

While many of these countries are members of the Commonwealth some, notably Ireland, are not and the Commonwealth has no role in the development of technical standards. Some of its members have never used this tone. Canada for example has always used the North American tone plan and several other members use European ringing tones modelled on ETSI or ITU guidelines.

Many countries also do not use the full British tone plan. Several use ETSI tones for busy, reorder etc, alongside a UK type ring.

Japan
In Japan, the standard audible ringing tone is a repeating one-second tone with a two-second pause between. The tone has a frequency of 400 ± 20 Hz, and the amplitude modulation is 15 to 20 Hz.

India
In India, the ringing tone is called caller ringback tone (CRBT), which varies with different network operators.

Personalized ringing tones
Some telecommunication carriers have offered a service called of ringback tones, which play a song of the subscriber's choice in lieu of the standard ringing tone. 

Patents for personalized ringing tone delivery systems were first filed in Korea by Kang-seok Kim (10-1999-0005344) in October 1999 and in the United States by Mark  Gregorek et al. (U.S. patent 5,321,740), and Neil Sleevi (U.S. patent 4,811,382). The first functional ringing tone replacement system was invented by Karl Seelig (U.S. patents 7,006,608 and 7,227,929). In 2001, Seelig's prototype was described in the Orange County Register and the Economist Magazine. Onmobile Global Ltd. India filed a patent entitled Method and system for customizing ringing tone in an inter-operator telecommunication system on Nov, 18 2010.

The first US national carrier offering this service was Verizon Wireless in 2004. Because of low sales, AT&T stopped offering ringback tones in 2014.

Ringback music
Also known as caller tunes in some countries, such as India, ringback music is a service offered by mobile network operators to permit subscribers to select music or even install personalized recorded sounds for audible ringing.

Ringback advertising
Ringback tone advertising (AdRBT) was introduced using a range of models in several commercial markets in 2008. In America, Ring Plus offered the first interactive advertisement platform. In Turkey, 4play Digital Workshop launched 'TonlaKazaan' AdRBT with Turkcell, and Xipto AdRBT launched in the United States with Cincinnati Bell wireless; OnMobile launched an Ad-supported Music RBT program in India with Vodafone. 4Play Digital workshop accumulated several hundred thousand users of their service in the first few months of commercial deployment, and received an innovation award in February 2009 at the Mobile World Congress in Barcelona. AdRBT typically rewards the caller or the called party with discounted Music RBT service, free minutes, cash, or other rewards in return for accepting advertising messages integrated with Music Ringback, or for selecting advertisements instead of music as a personalized advertising ringback.

In May 2011, Adfortel started the first ad-sponsored calling service in Austria with Orange, with users hearing a targeted advertisement instead of the regular waiting ring tone.

A Juniper Research report released in January 2011 predicts that ringback tone advertising will reach $780 million annually by 2015.

Interactive reverse ringing tone
Interactive reverse ringback tones (IRRBT) are the same as normal ringback tones but have interactive functionalities and are targeted to the person who configures the tone. IRRBTs are heard on the telephone line by the caller who sets the IRRBT while the phone they are calling is ringing. 

Unlike the RBT, the IRRBT is often generated in the nearest switch and transmitted in-band, so the IRRBT will take precedence if both are configured.
 
Social network ringback tones provide interactive social network content to subscribers. Mixcess is the first platform (social network) using IRRBTs in the United States. The IRRBT was developed by Ring Plus, Inc. (U.S. Patent No. 7,227,929 invented by Karl Seelig, et al.). The IRRBT can be used to share videos, music and messages from friends.

See also
 Ringtone
 Dial tone
 Busy signal
 Off-hook tone
 Reorder tone

References

Telephony signals